Rapid reaction forces are brigade-strength forces with high combat readiness, immediate response speed, flexible and highly mobile that are able to operate independently, within Jordanian forces, or with friendly and allied forces to defend Jordanian national security within the borders of the Kingdom of Jordan or Outside in all circumstances at the time and place and in accordance with the orders of the General Command of the Armed Forces.

The most important distinguishing features of the rapid intervention forces are the manpower, weapons and equipment appropriate to this brigade, the possibility of early and timely intervention, and the professional training received by the brigade.

History
The brigade was formed on August 1, 2014 as the rapid reaction force (Desert Hawk), then became on 5 November 2017 Rapid reaction Brigade and on June 25, 2018 was renamed under the banner of rapid intervention / high-readiness brigade, which is subordinate to Directorate of joint military operations. In 2017, the units from deactivated 28th Royal Ranger Brigade transferred to QRF Brigade.

In November, 2018  the brigade was renamed the "Sheikh Mohammed Bin Zayed Al Nahyan Rapid Intervention/High Readiness Brigade". Naming the brigade after the UAE crown prince was an “expression of the deep brotherly ties” between the two countries and comes in appreciation of the role of Sheikh Mohammed and the UAE in supporting the JAF, especially in military housing projects and training schools, according to a Royal Court statement.

Mission
Jordan has created the brigade to provide a rapid-response capability against situations that may flare up rapidly, particularly along the borders, and to sustain operations for several days. The brigade is an important element in the containment of Daesh and other extremist forces, and both the US and UK have supported this initiative with training and equipment. The Joint Special Operations Command has also taken an important role in shaping the structure and tactical employment of the brigade.

Rapid mobility is a crucial element, and additional Sikorsky UH-60 Black Hawks – which have been in JSOC service for some time – have been procured from the US to allow the immediate deployment of the brigade, along with more land vehicles. Communication is another important area in which new systems are being acquired, allowing Jordan to develop a fully deployable command and control capability.
The Brigade has its own Joint Tactical Air Controllers (JTACs).

Brigade Objectives
 Direct and Indirect Action Operations Inside and Outside the Kingdom.
 Border Area Operations.
 Assist and Support King Abdullah II Special Forces Group.
 Internal Security Operations.
 Humanitarian Assistance Operations (Refugees - Civil Affairs).

Organizational structure
 Brigade Command HQ
Command Staff
 Signal Company
 Female Engagement Platoon
 105mm Mobile Artillery Company (M119 howitzer)
 Special Engineer Company
 Combat Service Support Company
 Brigade Maintenance Unit
 Medical Support Center
 61st Quick Reaction Force Battalion (Raiders)
 Attached to Southern Command
 The unit is specialized in Direct & In-direct Actions, Mountain Warfare, Advanced CSAR, Special Reconnaissance, Airborne, Air-assault & Maritime Operations.
 81st Quick Reaction Force Battalion
 Attached to Northern Command
 The unit is specialized in Direct & In-direct Actions, Jungle Warfare, Reconnaissance, Airborne, Air-assault & Maritime Operations.
 91st Quick Reaction Force Battalion
 Attached to Central Command
 The unit is specialized in Direct & In-direct Actions, Desert Warfare, Special JTAC, Airborne, Air-assault & Maritime Operations.
 Supporting Arms Virtual Trainer (SAVT) Center. 
 Designed to train JTAC’s, Mortar teams, the SAVT provides a fully immersive environment in which virtual aircraft come to life in a large domed building.
 Brigade Training Center

References

Special forces
Special Forces
Protective security units
Military units and formations established in 2014